VOSS Solutions (or VisionOSS) is a British-founded multinational provider of digital workplace management technology, headquartered in  Garland, Texas, that provides automation management software.

History
VOSS Solutions was established in 2003 and headquartered in Richardson, Texas, with additional offices in Reading, Berkshire, United Kingdom and Cape Town, South Africa. The company was co-founded by Henry Barton, Christopher May, Derek Lipscombe and Stefan Peters in Reading, Berkshire, United Kingdom. Lipscombe is a director of VOSS Solutions, Barton is the vice-president of strategy, Peters is the vice-president of sales and May is the vice-president of business development. The company's chief executive officer (CEO) is Michael Frayne. May and Frayne usually contribute to Cisco Telephony Tribune, an independent report on the Cisco telephony market published by Telecom Reseller.

VOSS became Cisco System's market partner in 2005 for the service provider managed services market and is the UC management platform in Cisco's Hosted Collaboration Solution (HCS).

The company is a past winner of the Total Telecom World Vendor Awards. It is a past finalist of the UBM Tech Best of Enterprise Connect, the European Tech Tour UK & Ireland Tech Tour, The Sunday Times Tech Track 100 and the Clearwater Cloudex 20:20.

The company raised funding from investors in 2008 and 2011. VOSS Solutions' $12m series B funding round in 2008 was spearheaded by Eden Ventures and XAnge Private Equity. The first phase of the company's $10m series C funding round in 2011 was led by Intel Capital, and included investment from existing investors Eden Ventures and XAnge Private Equity. Vodafone Ventures led the second phase of the series C funding round, acquiring an 8% stake.

In 2015, VOSS onboarded its 100th service provider customer and expanded its offering to include reporting and analytics products.

In 2016, VOSS started supporting both Microsoft and Cisco technology.

In 2017, VOSS signed an OEM agreement with LayerX Technologies, addressing the growing market need for insight into and understanding of UC platform performance.

VOSS entered the contact center management market in 2019, and the Phone Server market in 2020

VOSS was voted Best Service Management vendor by UC Today in 2020.

In 2021, VOSS launched VOSS MaaS – a UC automation management tool in a hosted delivery model.

In 2021, VOSS Solutions announced its latest round of funding – $15m – from existing investors and shareholders to position the company for ongoing growth and expansion. The growth funding round was led by Verdane, the Northern European specialist growth equity investor, expanding the investment firm's shareholding in the company, with new investment capital from Claret Capital Partners who participated with both equity and debt. Existing investors, Vodafone Ventures and Foncière Georges Mignon NV, also supported the funding round.

At this time, VOSS also acquired LayerX.

Products and services
VOSS Solutions is a developer of unified communications and collaboration service delivery and management software, with a focus on highly agile service orchestration. It is a provider of unified communications and collaboration middleware. The company is also a developer of SIP Trunking and SIP Application Server solutions. It has developed a number of unified communications and collaboration tools, including Unified Communications Business Analytics Solution (UC-BAS) and VOSS Migration Services, previously called Unified Communications On-Boarding Toolset (UC-OBT) or User Deployment Service. Its core product is the VOSS-4-UC service delivery platform.

VOSS Migrate

VOSS Migrate uses a sophisticated and revolutionary methodology to discover, extract, transform, validate, and load large volumes of users, devices and UC services, to enable organizations to rapidly and efficiently carry out UC migration projects. It is designed to work with Cisco Hosted Collaboration Solution (HCS), Microsoft, Avaya, Zoom, Pexip and other UC platforms.

VOSS Automate
VOSS Automate is a real-time automated unified communications and collaboration service delivery platform. It is a policy based platform that supports centralized creation and management of unified communications services and applications. VOSS works in multi-vendor and hybrid environments, and it supports both private and public cloud. It is designed to provide management and provisioning of unified communications and collaboration services for large enterprises and service providers or telecommunication networks.

Features of VOSS include web-based administration, central management with devolved admin and self-service, collaboration management across the lifecycle of a UC service, and contact center management. It is a business process layer that seamlessly integrates with third party UC, collaboration and other business tools, overarching the network infrastructure and communications architecture, to provide a single pane of glass view of the entire UC estate.

Affiliations
The VOSS service delivery platform is deployed in many enterprise and service providers or telecommunication networks, including Inteliquent, Lattelecom, and Qwest., Aplines Health, BCX, Flexity, Axians, Bucher + Suter, Node4
BT partnered with Cisco and VOSS Solutions to deploy cloud-based unified communications and collaboration services for the 2012 London Olympics.

See also
 Operations support system (OSS)
 Software as a service (SaaS)
 Unified communications management

References

Unified communications
Companies established in 2003
Companies based in Richardson, Texas
Software companies of the United Kingdom
2003 establishments in the United Kingdom